Spirit Bird is the seventh studio album by Australian multi-instrumentalist Xavier Rudd. It was released on 8 June 2012.

Recording
Rudd recorded most of the album in Ontario, Canada at a studio in a wooden cottage by a lake. "Follow The Sun", which features the sound of magpies at the start, was the last track recorded for the album, and the only song recorded outside of Canada, at Studios 301 in Byron Bay.

Reception
The album debuted at number 36 on the Canadian Albums Chart and at number 2 on the ARIA album chart. In the album's first week of release it was the biggest selling album in Western Australia, Queensland and Victoria.

Track listing

Personnel

Production 
 Xavier Rudd - producer
 Luke Davis - instrument technician and production assistant
 Jordan Power - engineer
 Scott Horscroft - audio mixer
 Steve Smart - mastering

Design 
 Dersu Rhodes - art direction and design

Charts

References

2012 albums
Xavier Rudd albums